ABC Illawarra is an ABC Local Radio station based in Wollongong and broadcasting to the Illawarra region in New South Wales.  This includes the towns of Nowra, Shellharbour, Kiama, and Bowral. 
The station began as 2WN in 1959 originally broadcasting on the AM band. It now transmits on the main FM frequency of 97.3 MHz along with a low power FM repeater.

See also
 List of radio stations in Australia

References

Illawarra
Radio stations in New South Wales
Radio stations established in 1959
Wollongong